Five Christmas songs (Viisi joululaulua), Op. 1, are four songs in Swedish and one in Finnish by Finnish composer Jean Sibelius. The songs were written between 1897 and 1913:

Nu står jul vid snöig port (Joulupukki kolkuttaa) (Zacharias Topelius, 1913)
Nu så kommer julen (Jo on joulu täällä) (Zacharias Topelius, 1913)
Det mörknar ute (Jo joutuu ilta) (Zacharias Topelius, ca 1897)
Julvisa (Jouluvirsi, En etsi valtaa loistoa) (Zacharias Topelius, 1909); original Swedish title: Giv mig ej glans, ej guld, ej prakt
On hanget korkeat, nietokset (Wilkku Joukahainen, 1901)

References 

Compositions by Jean Sibelius
Classical song cycles in Finnish
Art songs